The Church of Jesus' Heart (Jesu Hjerte Kirke) is a Roman Catholic church in the Vesterbro/Kongens Enghave area of Copenhagen, Denmark. It was built in 1895 and is dedicated to the Sacred Heart of Jesus.

See also
 List of Jesuit sites

Sources
http://www.jesuhjertekirke.dk/side603.html

Roman Catholic churches in Copenhagen
Churches in the Roman Catholic Diocese of Copenhagen
Roman Catholic churches completed in 1895
1895 establishments in Denmark
19th-century Roman Catholic church buildings in Denmark